Kirana Gharana Music Academy is a Hindustani music school in Delhi that follows the guru–shishya tradition.

References

Music schools in India
Schools in Delhi
South West Delhi district